Nathaniel Upham (June 9, 1774 – July 10, 1829) was an American politician and a United States representative from New Hampshire.

Early life
Upham was born in Deerfield in the Province of New Hampshire on June 9, 1774, pursued classical studies and attended the Phillips Exeter Academy in Exeter in 1793. He engaged in mercantile pursuits at Gilmanton in 1794, at Deerfield in 1796, at Portsmouth in 1801, and at Rochester in 1802 and afterward.

Career
Upham was a member of the New Hampshire House of Representatives 1807–1809. He was a governor’s counselor in 1811 and 1812 and was elected as a Democratic-Republican to the Fifteenth Congress and reelected to the Sixteenth and Seventeenth Congresses (March 4, 1817 – March 3, 1823). He declined to be a candidate for renomination in 1822. After leaving Congress, he returned to Rochester, and became interested in educational work.

Death
Upham died in Rochester on July 10, 1829, and is interred at Old Rochester Cemetery.

Family life
Upham descended from an early American family. The Uphams first came to the United States in 1635, when John Upham settled in Weymouth, Massachusetts. Nathaniel was one of two sons born six generations later to Rev. Timothy Upham, the pastor of the Congregationalist church in Deerfield, New Hampshire. His younger brother, Timothy, was a Lieutenant Colonel in the United States Army during the War of 1812.

Upham's eldest son was Thomas Cogswell Upham, a dominant figure in American academic psychology during the 19th century, a writer of devotional works, and a biographer of Madame Guyon. He second-eldest son was Nathaniel Gookin Upham, an Associate Justice of the New Hampshire Supreme Court and fellow state legislator.

References

External links

 

1774 births
1829 deaths
Phillips Exeter Academy alumni
Members of the New Hampshire House of Representatives
Democratic-Republican Party members of the United States House of Representatives from New Hampshire